In religion, a prophet or prophetess is an individual who is regarded as being in contact with a divine being and is said to speak on behalf of that being, serving as an intermediary with humanity by delivering messages or teachings from the supernatural source to other people. The message that the prophet conveys is called a prophecy.

Claims of prophethood have existed in many cultures and religions throughout history, including Judaism, Christianity, Islam, ancient Greek religion, Zoroastrianism, Manichaeism, Hinduism, and many others.

Etymology 
The English word prophet is the transliteration of a compound Greek word derived from pro (before/toward) and phesein (to tell); thus, a προφήτης (prophḗtēs) is someone who conveys messages from the divine to humans, including occasionally foretelling future events. In a different interpretation, it means advocate or speaker.

In Hebrew, the word נָבִיא (nāvî), "spokesperson", traditionally translates as "prophet". The second subdivision of the Tanakh, (Nevi'im), is devoted to the Hebrew prophets. The meaning of Navi is perhaps described in Deuteronomy 18:18, where God said, "...and I will put My words in his mouth, and he shall speak unto them all that I shall command him." Thus, the Navi was thought to be the "mouth" of God. The root nun-bet-alef ("Navi") is based on the two-letter root nun-bet which denotes hollowness or openness; to receive transcendental wisdom, one must make oneself "open".

Abrahamic religions

Judaism 

In addition to writing and speaking messages from God, Israelite or Judean nevi'im ("spokespersons", "prophets") often acted out prophetic parables in their life. For example, in order to contrast the people's disobedience with the obedience of the Rechabites, God has Jeremiah invite the Rechabites to drink wine, in disobedience to their ancestor's command. The Rechabites refuse, for which God commends them. Other prophetic parables acted out by Jeremiah include burying a linen belt so that it gets ruined to illustrate how God intends to ruin Judah's pride. Likewise, Jeremiah buys a clay jar and smashes it in the Valley of Ben Hinnom in front of elders and priests to illustrate that God will smash the nation of Judah and the city of Judah beyond repair. God instructs Jeremiah to make a yoke from wood and leather straps and to put it on his own neck to demonstrate how God will put the nation under the yoke of Nebuchadnezzar, king of Babylon. In a similar way, the prophet Isaiah had to walk stripped and barefoot for three years to illustrate the coming captivity, and the prophet Ezekiel had to lie on his side for 390 days and eat measured food to illustrate the coming siege.

Prophetic assignment is usually portrayed as rigorous and exacting in the Hebrew Bible, and prophets were often the target of persecution and opposition. God's personal prediction for Jeremiah, "Attack you they will, overcome you they can't," was performed many times in the biblical narrative as Jeremiah warned of destruction of those who continued to refuse repentance and accept more moderate consequences. In return for his adherence to God's discipline and speaking God's words, Jeremiah was attacked by his own brothers, beaten and put into the stocks by a priest and false prophet, imprisoned by the king, threatened with death, thrown into a cistern by Judah's officials, and opposed by a false prophet. Likewise, Isaiah was told by his hearers who rejected his message, "Leave the way! Get off the path! Let us hear no more about the Holy One of Israel!" The life of Moses being threatened by Pharaoh is another example.

According to I Samuel 9:9, the old name for navi is ro'eh, רֹאֶה, which literally means "Seer". That could document an ancient shift, from viewing prophets as seers for hire to viewing them as moral teachers. L.C. Allen (1971) comments that in the First Temple Era, there were essentially seer-priests belonging to a guild, who performed divination, rituals, and sacrifices, and were scribes; and beside these were canonical prophets, who did none of these things (and condemned divination), but came to deliver a message. The seer-priests were usually attached to a local shrine or temple, such as Shiloh, and initiated others into that priesthood, acting as a mystical craft-guild with apprentices and recruitment. Canonical prophets were not organised this way.

Some examples of prophets in the Tanakh include Abraham, Moses, Miriam, Isaiah, Samuel, Ezekiel, Malachi, and Job. In Jewish tradition Daniel is not counted in the list of prophets.

A Jewish tradition suggests that there were twice as many prophets as the number which left Egypt, which would make 1,200,000 prophets. The Talmud recognizes 48 male prophets who bequeathed permanent messages to mankind. According to the Talmud, there were also seven women counted as prophetesses whose message bears relevance for all generations: Sarah, Miriam, Devorah, Hannah (mother of the prophet Samuel), Abigail (a wife of King David), Huldah (from the time of Jeremiah), and Esther. The Talmudic and Biblical commentator Rashi points out that Rebecca, Rachel, and Leah were also prophets.
Isaiah 8:3-4 refers his wife "the prophetess", who bore his son Maher-shalal-hash-baz; she is not referred to elsewhere.

Prophets in Tanakh are not always Jews, for example the non-Jewish prophet Balaam in Numbers 22. According to the Talmud, Obadiah is said to have been a convert to Judaism.

The last nevi'im mentioned in the Jewish Bible are Haggai, Zechariah, and Malachi, all of whom lived at the end of the 70-year Babylonian exile. The Talmud (Sanhedrin 11a) states that Haggai, Zachariah, and Malachi were the last prophets, and later times have known only the "Bath Kol" (בת קול, lit. daughter of a voice, "voice of God").

Christianity

Traditional definitions 
In Christianity, a prophet (or seer) is one inspired by God through the Holy Spirit to deliver a message. This includes the prophets of ancient Israel as well as those who function(ed) as prophets in the Church. Concerning the latter concept, some Christian denominations limit a prophet's message to words intended only for the entire church congregation, excluding personal messages not intended for the body of believers; but in the Bible on a number of occasions prophets were called to deliver personal messages. The reception of a message is termed revelation and the delivery of the message is termed prophecy.

The term "prophet" applies to those who receive public or private revelation. Public revelation, in Catholicism, is part of the Deposit of faith, the revelation of which was completed by Jesus; whereas private revelation does not add to the Deposit. The term "deposit of faith" refers to the entirety of Jesus Christ's revelation, and is passed to successive generations in two different forms, sacred scripture (the Bible) and sacred tradition.

The Bible applies the appellation 'false prophet' to anyone who preaches a Gospel contrary to that delivered to the apostles and recorded in Sacred Scripture. One Old Testament text in Deuteronomy contains a warning against those who prophesy events which do not come to pass and says they should be put to death. Elsewhere a false prophet may be someone who is purposely trying to deceive, is delusional, under the influence of Satan or is speaking from his own spirit.

Ongoing prophecy 

Christians who believe that the Holy Spirit continues to give spiritual gifts to Christians are known as continuationists. These charismata may include prophecy, tongues, miraculous healing ability, and discernment (Matthew 12:32 KJV "Whosoever speaketh a word against the Son of Man, it shall be forgiven him: but whosoever speaketh against the Holy Ghost, it shall not be forgiven him, neither in this world, neither in the world to come."). Cessationists believe that these gifts were given only in New Testament times and that they ceased after the last apostle died.

The last prophet of the Old Covenant before the arrival of Jesus is John the Baptist. New Testament passages that explicitly discuss prophets existing after the death and resurrection of Christ include Revelation 11:10, Matthew 10:40–41 and 23:34, John 13:20 and 15:20 and Acts 11:25–30, 13:1 and 15:32.

The Didache gives extensive instruction in how to distinguish between true and false prophets, as well as commands regarding tithes to prophets in the church. Irenaeus, wrote of 2nd-century believers with the gift of prophecy, while Justin Martyr argued in his Dialogue with Trypho that prophets were not found among the Jews in his time, but that the church had prophets. The Shepherd of Hermas describes revelation in a vision regarding the proper operation of prophecy in the church. Eusebius mentions that Quadratus and Ammia of Philadelphia were both prominent prophets following the age of the Twelve Apostles. Tertullian, writing of the church meetings of the Montanists (to whom he belonged), described in detail the practice of prophecy in the 2nd-century church.

A number of later Christian saints were claimed to have powers of prophecy, such as Columba of Iona (521–597), Saint Malachy (1094–1148) or Padre Pio (1887–1968). Marian apparitions like those at Fatima in 1917 or at Kibeho in Rwanda in the 1980s often included prophetic predictions regarding the future of the world as well as of the local areas they occurred in.

Prophetic movements in particular can be traced throughout the Christian Church's history, expressing themselves in (for example) Montanism, Novatianism, Donatism, Franciscanism, Anabaptism, Camisard enthusiasm, Puritanism, Quakerism, Quietism, Lutheranism and Radical Pietism. Modern Pentecostals and Charismatics, members of movements which together comprised approximately 584 million people , believe in the contemporary function of the gift of prophecy, and some in these movements, especially those within the Apostolic-Prophetic Movement, allow for idea that God may continue to gift the church with some individuals who are prophets.

Some Christian sects recognize the existence of "modern-day" prophets. One such denomination is the Church of Jesus Christ of Latter-day Saints, which teaches that God still communicates with mankind through prophecy.

Islam 

The Quran identifies a number of men as "Prophets of Islam" ( nabī; pl.  anbiyāʾ). Muslims believe such individuals were assigned a special mission by God to guide humanity. Besides Muhammad, this includes prophets such as Abraham (Ibrāhīm), Moses (Mūsā) and Jesus (ʿĪsā).

Although only twenty-five prophets are mentioned by name in the Quran, a hadith (no. 21257 in Musnad Ahmad ibn Hanbal) mentions that there were (more or less) 124,000 prophets in total throughout history. Other traditions place the number of prophets at 224,000. Some scholars hold that there are an even greater number in the history of mankind, and only God knows. The Quran says that God has sent a prophet to every group of people throughout time and that Muhammad is the last of the prophets, sent for the whole of humankind. The message of all the prophets is believed to be the same. In Islam, all prophetic messengers are prophets (such as Adam, Noah, Abraham, Moses, Jesus, and Muhammad) though not all prophets are prophetic messengers. The primary distinction is that a prophet is required to demonstrate God's law through his actions, character, and behavior without necessarily calling people to follow him, while a prophetic messenger is required to pronounce God's law (i.e. revelation) and call his people to submit and follow him. Muhammad is distinguished from the rest of the prophetic messengers and prophets in that God commissioned him to be the prophetic messenger to all of mankind. Many of these prophets are also found in the texts of Judaism (The Torah, the Prophets, and the Writings) and Christianity.

Muslims often refer to Muhammad as "the Prophet", in the form of a noun. Jesus is the result of a virgin birth in Islam as in Christianity, and is regarded as a prophet.

Traditionally, four prophets are believed to have been sent holy books: the Torah (Tawrat) to Moses, the Psalms (Zābūr) to David, the Gospel(Injil) to Jesus, and the Quran to Muhammad; those prophets are considered "Messengers" or rasūl. Other main prophets are considered messengers or nabī, even if they didn't receive a Book from God. Examples include the messenger-prophet Aaron (Hārūn), the messenger-prophet Ishmael (Ismāʿīl) and the messenger-prophet Joseph (Yūsuf).

Although it offers many incidents from the lives of many prophets, the Quran focuses with special narrative and rhetorical emphasis on the careers of the first four of these five major prophets. Of all the figures before Muhammad, the significance of Jesus in Islam is reflected in his being mentioned in the Quran in 93 verses with various titles attached such as "Son of Mary" and other relational terms, mentioned directly and indirectly, over 187 times. He is thus the most mentioned person in the Quran by reference; 25 times by the name Isa, third-person 48 times, first-person 35 times, and the rest as titles and attributes. Moses (Musa) and Abraham (Ibrahim) are also referred to frequently in the Quran. As for the fifth, the Quran is frequently addressed directly to Muhammad, and it often discusses situations encountered by him. Direct use of his name in the text, however, is rare. Rarer still is the mention of Muhammad's contemporaries.

Several prominent exponents of the Fatimid Ismaili Imams explained that throughout history there have been six enunciators who brought the exoteric revelation to humans, namely: Adam, Noah, Abraham, Moses, Jesus and Muhammad. They speak of a seventh enunciator, the Resurrector (Qa’im), who will unveil the esoteric meaning of all the previous revelations. He is believed to be the pinnacle and purpose of creation. The enunciators (sing. ) who are the Prophets and the Imams in their respective times, are the highest hierarch. The enunciators signal the beginning of a new age in humankind, whereas the Imams unveil and present the esoteric meaning of the revelation to the people. These individuals are both known as the ‘Lord of the Age’ or the ‘Lord of the Time’. Through them, one can know God, and their invitation to humans to recognize God is called the invitation.

According to Shia Islam, all Prophets and Imams are infallible and the belief in their abstinence from intentional and unintentional sins is a part of the creed. Thus, it is accordingly believed that they are the examples to be followed and that they act as they preach. This belief includes some ʾAwliyāʾ such as Lady Fatima and Lady Mary.

Ifá and other African traditional religions 

Divination remains an important aspect of the lives of the people of contemporary Africa, especially amongst the usually rural, socially traditionalistic segments of its population. In arguably its most influential manifestation, the system of prophecy practiced by the Babalawos and Iyanifas of the historically Yoruba regions of West Africa have bequeathed to the world a corpus of fortune-telling poetic methodologies so intricate that they have been added by UNESCO to its official intangible cultural heritage of the World list.

Native Americans 

The Great Peacemaker (sometimes referred to as Deganawida or Dekanawida) co-founded the Haudenosaunee league in pre-Columbian times. In retrospect, his prophecy of the boy seer could appear to refer to the conflict between natives and Europeans (white serpent).

From 1805 until the Battle of Tippecanoe that falsified his predictions in 1811, the "Shawnee prophet" Tenskwatawa led an Indian alliance to stop Europeans from taking more and more land going west. He reported visions he had. He is said to have accurately predicted a solar eclipse. His brother Tecumseh re-established the alliance for Tecumseh's War, that ended with the latter's death in 1813. Tecumseh fought together with British forces that, in the area of the Great Lakes, occupied essentially today's territory of Canada.

Francis the Prophet, influenced by Tecumseh and Tenskwatawa, was a leader of the Red Stick faction of the Creek Indians. He traveled to England in 1815 as a representative of the "four Indian nations" in an unsuccessful attempt to get Great Britain to help them resist the expansionism of the white settlers.

20 years later (1832), Wabokieshiek, the "Winnebago Prophet", after whom Prophetstown has been named, (also called "White Cloud") claimed that British forces would support the Indians in the Black Hawk War against the United States as 20 years earlier (based on "visions"). They did not, and he was no longer considered a "prophet".

In 1869, the Paiute Wodziwob founded the Ghost Dance movement. The dance rituals were an occasion to announce his visions of an earthquake that would swallow the whites. He seems to have died in 1872.

The Northern Paiute Wovoka claimed he had a vision during the solar eclipse of January 1, 1889, that the Paiute dead would come back and the whites would vanish from America, provided the natives performed Ghost Dances. This idea spread among other Native American peoples. The government were worried about a rebellion and sent troops, which lead to the death of Sitting Bull and to the Wounded Knee massacre in 1890.

Prophetic claims in religious traditions 
In modern times the term "prophet" can be somewhat controversial. Many Christians with Pentecostal or charismatic beliefs believe in the continuation of the gift of prophecy and the continuation of the role of prophet as taught in Ephesians 4. The content of prophecies can vary widely. Prophecies are often spoken as quotes from God. They may contain quotes from scripture, statements about the past or current situation, or predictions of the future. Prophecies can also 'make manifest the secrets' of the hearts of other people, telling about the details of their lives. Sometimes, more than one person in a congregation will receive the same message in prophecy, with one giving it before another.

Other movements claim to have prophets. In France, Michel Potay says he received a revelation, called The Revelation of Arès, dictated by Jesus in 1974, then by God in 1977. He is considered a prophet by his followers, the Pilgrims of Arès.

Claims in Abrahamic religions

Baháʼí Faith 

The Baháʼí Faith refers to what are commonly called prophets as "Manifestations of God" who are directly linked with the concept of progressive revelation. Baháʼís believe that the will of God is expressed at all times and in many ways, including through a series of divine messengers referred to as "Manifestations of God" or "divine educators". In expressing God's intent, these Manifestations are seen to establish religion in the world. Thus they are seen as an intermediary between God and humanity.

The Manifestations of God are not seen as incarnations of God, and are also not seen as ordinary mortals. Instead, the Baháʼí concept of the Manifestation of God emphasizes simultaneously the humanity of that intermediary and the divinity in the way they show forth the will, knowledge and attributes of God; thus they have both human and divine stations.

In addition to the Manifestations of God, there are also minor prophets. While the Manifestations of God, or major prophets, are compared to the Sun (which produces its own heat and light), minor prophets are compared to the Moon (which receives its light from the sun). Moses, for example, is taught as having been a Manifestation of God and his brother Aaron a minor prophet. Moses spoke on behalf of God, and Aaron spoke on behalf of Moses (Exodus 4:14–17). Other Jewish prophets are considered minor prophets, as they are considered to have come in the shadow of the dispensation of Moses to develop and consolidate the process he set in motion.

Christianity

Catholicism 
A number of modern catholic saints have been claimed to have powers of prophecy, such as Padre Pio and Alexandrina Maria da Costa.

In addition to this many modern Marian apparitions included prophecies in them about the world and about the local areas. The Fátima apparition in 1917 included a prophecy given by Mary to three children, that on October 13, 1917, there would be a great miracle for all to see at Fátima, Portugal, and on that day tens of thousands of people headed to Fátima to see what would happen including newspaper journalists. Many witnesses, including journalists, claimed to see the sun "dance" in the sky in the afternoon of that day, exactly as the visionaries had predicted several months before. The Kibeho apparition in Rwanda in the 1980s included many prophecies about great violence and destruction that was coming, and the Rwandan genocide only ten years later was interpreted by the visionaries as the fulfilment of these prophecies 

Several miracles and a vision of the identity of the last 112 Popes were attributed to Saint Malachy, the Archbishop of Armagh (1095–1148).

Jehovah's Witnesses 

Jehovah's Witnesses do not consider any single person in their modern-day organization to be a prophet. Their literature has referred to their organization collectively as God's "prophet" on earth, in the sense of declaring their interpretation of God's judgments from the Bible along with the guidance of God's holy spirit. Their publishing company, the Watch Tower Society has asserted: "Ever since The Watchtower began to be published in July 1879 it has looked ahead into the future... No, The Watchtower is no inspired prophet, but it follows and explains a Book of prophecy the predictions in which have proved to be unerring and unfailing till now. The Watchtower is therefore under safe guidance. It may be read with confidence, for its statements may be checked against that prophetic Book." They also claim they are God's only true channel to mankind on earth, and used by God for this purpose.

They have made various false predictions, and The Watchtower has acknowledged that Jehovah's Witnesses "have made mistakes in their understanding of what would occur at the end of certain time periods."

Latter Day Saint movement 

Joseph Smith, who established the Church of Christ in 1830, is considered a prophet by members of the Latter Day Saint movement, of which the Church of Jesus Christ of Latter-day Saints (LDS Church) is the largest denomination. Additionally, many churches within the movement believe in a succession of modern prophets (accepted by Latter Day Saints as "prophets, seers, and revelators") since the time of Joseph Smith. Russell M. Nelson is the current Prophet and President of the Church of Jesus Christ of Latter-day Saints.

Adventism 
Baptist preacher William Miller is credited with beginning the mid-19th century North American religious movement now known as Adventism. He announced a Second Coming, resulting in the Great Disappointment.

Seventh-day Adventist 

The Seventh-day Adventist Church, which was established in 1863, believes that Ellen G. White, one of the church's founders, was given the spiritual gift of prophecy.

Branch Davidians 
The Branch Davidians are a religious cult which was founded in 1959 by Benjamin Roden as an offshoot of the Seventh-Day Adventist Church. David Koresh, who died in the well-known Waco Siege in 1993, claimed to be their final prophet and "the Son of God, the Lamb" in 1983.

Other Christian movements 
 Montanus, founder of Montanism, an early Christian movement of the 2nd century.
 Bernhard Müller, also known as Count de Leon, was a German Christian mystic.
 Emanuel Swedenborg, founder of Swedenborgianism, an 18th-century Swedish scientist, philosopher, theologian, revelator, and mystic movement.
 Hong Xiuquan, established the heterodox Christian sect which was named the "Heavenly Kingdom of Great Peace".
 John Alexander Dowie, a faith healer who founded the city of Zion, Illinois, and the Christian Catholic Apostolic Church.
 Nona L. Brooks, described as a "prophet of modern mystical Christianity", was a founder of the Church of Divine Science.
 William M. Branham, Christian minister, usually credited with founding the post-World War II faith healing movement.
 Gerald Flurry, founder and head of the Philadelphia Church of God, who claimed he is 'that prophet' mentioned in John 1:21–22.

Islam

Ahmadiyya 

The Ahmadiyya movement in Islam believes that Mirza Ghulam Ahmad was a non law-bearing Prophet, who claimed to be a fulfillment of the various Islamic prophecies regarding the spiritual second advent of Jesus of Nazareth near the end times.

Other Islamic movements 
 Noble Drew Ali, Prophet and founder of the Moorish Science Temple of America, founder of the Moorish Divine and National Movement, 1913 AD, Newark N.J.
 Rashad Khalifa, founder of the religious group United Submitters International (USI).

Judaic Messianism 
Nathan of Gaza was a theologian and author who became famous as a prophet for the alleged messiah, Sabbatai Zevi.

Claims in other religious traditions 
 Aleister Crowley, founder of Thelema.
 Lou de Palingboer, founder and figurehead of a new religious movement in the Netherlands.
 Mani, founder of Manichaeism, a quasi-Gnostic movement of late antiquity.
 Marshall Vian Summers, founder of the New Message from God religious movement.
 Tenrikyo's prophet, Nakayama Miki, is believed by Tenrikyoans to have been a messenger of God.
 Zoroaster, founder of Zoroastrianism.

Secular usage 
The designation of "Victorian prophet" has been used in reference to cultural critics of the era, such as Thomas Carlyle and John Ruskin.

In the late 20th century the appellation of prophet has been used to refer to individuals particularly successful at analysis in the field of economics, such as in the derogatory prophet of greed. Alternatively, social commentators who suggest escalating crisis are often called prophets of doom.

See also 
 Oracle
 Major prophet
 Mediumship
 Prophethood (Ahmadiyya)
 Table of prophets of Abrahamic religions

References

Further reading 
 Ashe, Geoffrey. 2001. Encyclopedia of Prophecy, Santa Barbara, ABC-Clio.
 
 Jürgen Beyer. 2002. 'Prophezeiungen', Enzyklopädie des Märchens: Handwörterbuch zur historischen und vergleichenden Erzählforschung [N.B.: In English renders as "Encyclopedia of the fairy tale: Handy dictionary for historical and comparative tale research"]. Berlin & New York: Walter de Gruyter. In vol. 10, on col. 1419–1432.
 Stacey Campbell. 2008. Ecstatic Prophecy. Grand Rapids, Mich.: Chosen Books/Baker Publishing Group. .
 Marcus Tullius Cicero. 1997. De divinatione. Trans. Arthur Stanley Pease. Darmstadt: Wissenschaflliche Buchgesellschaft.
 
 Elst, Koenraad (1993). Psychology of prophetism: A secular look at the Bible. New Delhi: Voice of India. 
 Leon Festinger, Henry W. Riecken, Stanley Schachter. (1956). When Prophecy Fails: A Social and Psychological Study of a Modern Group that Predicted the Destruction of the World. University of Minnesota Press. 
 Christopher Forbes. 1997. Prophecy and Inspired Speech: in Early Christianity and Its Hellenistic Environment. Peabody, Mass.: Hendrickson. .
 Clifford S. Hill. 1991. Prophecy, Past and Present: an Exploration of the Prophetic Ministry in the Bible and the Church today. Ann Arbor, Mich.: Vine. .
June Helm. (1994). Prophecy and Power among the Dogrib Indians. University of Nebraska Press.
 Clifford A. Pickover. (2001). Dreaming the Future: The Fantastic Story of Prediction. Prometheus Books. 
 James Randi. (1993). The Mask of Nostradamus: Prophecies of the World's Famous Seer. Prometheus Books. 
 H. H. Rowley. 1956. Prophecy and Religion in Ancient China and Israel. New York: Harper & Brothers. vi, 154 p.

External links 

 Etymology of the English word "prophet"
 Entry for prophecy, prophet, and prophetess at the Catholic Encyclopedia on-line edition
 Entry for prophecy and prophets at the Jewish Encyclopedia
 Prophetic Midrash: An interdenominational, multilingual list of prophets, broadly defined
 
 

 
Religious belief and doctrine